The ten districts of Suriname are divided into 63 resorts (Dutch: ressorten). Within the capital city of Paramaribo, a resort entails a neighbourhood; in other cases it is more akin to a municipality, consisting of a central place with a few settlements around it. The resorts in the Sipaliwini District are especially large, since the interior of Suriname is sparsely inhabited.

According to article 161 of the Constitution of Suriname, the highest political body of the resort is the resort council. Elections for the resort council are held every five years and are usually at the same time as the Suriname general elections.

Overview map

List of resorts
The resorts are listed below, according to district.

Brokopondo District

The Brokopondo District consists of the following resorts:

Commewijne District

The Commewijne District consists of the following resorts:

Coronie District

The Coronie District consists of the following resorts:

Marowijne District

The Marowijne District consists of the following resorts:

Nickerie District

The Nickerie District consists of the following resorts:

Para District

The Para District consists of the following resorts:

Paramaribo District

The Paramaribo District consists of the following resorts:

Saramacca District

The Saramacca District consists of the following resorts:

Sipaliwini District

On 11 September 2019, a new resort was created out of Tapanahony, and is called Paramacca. The Paramacca resort is the northern part of Tapanahony, and mainly inhabited by the Paramaccan people.

The Sipaliwini District consists of the following resorts:

Wanica District

The Wanica District consists of the following resorts:

See also
 Districts of Suriname

References

 
Subdivisions of Suriname
Suriname, Resorts
Resorts, Suriname
Suriname geography-related lists